Abracadabra is a magic word, historically used as an incantation on amulets and common today in stage magic.

Etymology 

Abracadabra is of unknown origin, but according to the Oxford English Dictionary, its first known occurrence is in the second-century works of Serenus Sammonicus. 

Several folk etymologies are associated with the word: from phrases in Hebrew that mean "I will create as I speak", or Aramaic "I create like the word" (אברא כדברא), to folk etymologies that point to similar words in Latin and Greek such as abraxas or to its similarity to the first four letters of the Greek alphabet (alpha-beta-gamma-delta or ΑΒΓΔ). According to the OED Online, "no documentation has been found to support any of the various conjectures."

History
 
The first known mention of the word was in the second century AD in a book called Liber Medicinalis (sometimes known as De Medicina Praecepta Saluberrima) by Serenus Sammonicus, physician to the Roman emperor Caracalla, who in chapter 52 prescribed that malaria sufferers wear an amulet containing the word written in the form of a triangle.

The power of the amulet, he claimed, makes lethal diseases go away. Other Roman emperors, including Geta and Severus Alexander, were followers of the medical teachings of Serenus Sammonicus and may have used the incantation as well.

It was used as a magical formula by the Gnostics of the sect of Basilides in invoking the aid of beneficent spirits against disease and misfortune. It is found on Abraxas stones, which were worn as amulets. Subsequently, its use spread beyond the Gnostics.

The Puritan minister Increase Mather dismissed the word as bereft of power. Daniel Defoe also wrote dismissively about Londoners who posted the word on their doorways to ward off sickness during the Great Plague of London.

The religion of Thelema spells the word 'Abrahadabra', and considers it the magical formula of the current Aeon. The religion's founder, Aleister Crowley, explains in his essay Gematria that he discovered the word (and his spelling) by qabalistic methods. The word 'Abrahadabra' also appears repeatedly in the 1904 invocation of Horus that led to the founding of Thelema. (The Equinox I, no. 7. 1912) 

Abracadabra is now more commonly used as a magic word in the performance of stage magic. The word is one of a limited set of words that can be typed in its entirety using the left-handed side of a QWERTY keyboard.

See also
 — Spell from the Harry Potter series

References

External links

 Abracadabra  Robert Todd Carroll, Skeptic's Dictionary

Amulets
Magic words
Incantation
Superstitions of Europe
Macaronic language
Ancient Roman culture